Maxwell Thurmond (born March 1, 1978) is an American football coach, currently serving as a senior offensive analyst at Tennessee. He previously served as interim head football coach at Jacksonville State University after John Grass resigned with two games remaining in their 2001 season. Previous to serving as interim head coach for the Gamecocks, Thurmond served as an assistant coach for Reinhardt, West Alabama, Austin Peay, Central Arkansas, Charlotte, and Jacksonville State.

Head coaching record

Notes

References

1978 births
Living people
Austin Peay Governors football coaches
Charlotte 49ers football coaches
Central Arkansas Bears football coaches
Jacksonville State Gamecocks football coaches
Jacksonville State University alumni
Reinhardt Eagles football coaches
Tennessee Volunteers football coaches
West Alabama Tigers football coaches
People from Worth County, Georgia